Gideon Tabor Stewart (August 7, 1824 – June 10, 1909) was an American lawyer and politician who served as the Prohibition Party's vice presidential nominee in 1876. He was elected three times as grand worthy chief templar of the Good Templars of Ohio.

Early life and education

Stewart was born on August 7, 1824, in Johnstown, New York to Thomas and Elizabeth Ferguson Stewart. He studied at Oberlin College, but left before graduating to study law in Norwalk, Ohio. He later studied under Noah Haynes Swayne in Columbus, Ohio, for more than a year, and spent two years in Florida with his brother, before returning to Norwalk, where he was admitted to the bar in 1846. From 1850 to 1856 he served as auditor of Huron County, Ohio.

Career 
During the American Civil War he published Union newspapers in Iowa and then Toledo, Ohio, before returning to law practice in Norwalk in 1866. Throughout the 1850s he attempted to organize a permanent prohibition party and in 1869 a convention was held, with Stewart as one of the delegates, that established the national Prohibition Party and he was selected as the national secretary. Afterward, he served as the party candidate three times for governor of Ohio, seven times for judge on that state's Supreme Court, once for circuit court judge, and once for congress.

During the 1876 presidential election, he received three delegate votes for the Prohibition presidential nomination and was later given the vice presidential nomination to serve alongside Green Clay Smith and received 9,737 votes. In 1880, he was selected as the national chairman of the Prohibition party. During the 1892 presidential election he ran for the Prohibition presidential nomination, but was defeated by John Bidwell with 590 delegates to 179 delegates.

Personal life 
In 1857, he married Abby Newell Simmons and later had four children with her.

On June 10, 1909, died at his home in Pasadena, California due to heart failure at age 85.

Electoral history

References

1824 births
1909 deaths
19th-century American politicians
1876 United States vice-presidential candidates
Activists from Ohio
American newspaper editors
American temperance activists
County officials in Ohio
Iowa Republicans
Journalists from Ohio
Ohio lawyers
Ohio Prohibitionists
Oberlin College alumni
Ohio Republicans
Ohio Whigs
People from Johnstown, New York
People from Norwalk, Ohio
Prohibition Party (United States) vice presidential nominees